Lachina is a given name and surname. Notable people with the name include:

LaChina Robinson, American basketball analyst
Irina Lachina (born 1972), Moldovan-Russian actress

Russian-language surnames